Bob LeGare is an American politician who previously served as Mayor of Aurora, Colorado. Prior to being elected as mayor, he worked in real estate. He was succeeded by Mike Coffman. He also served for 15 years on the Aurora city council.

References

Living people
Mayors of Aurora, Colorado
Colorado Republicans
People from Villa Park, Illinois
1956 births